Apremont is a commune in the Vendée department in the Pays de la Loire region in western France.

Lac d'Apremont is formed by the Apremont dam at the town.

Demography

See also
Communes of the Vendée department

References

Communes of Vendée